Tears for Sale, also known internationally as Charleston & Vendetta or also as Funeral Brides (original title in , literal translation Charleston for Ognjenka), is a 2008 Serbian drama film.

Directed by Uroš Stojanović, it stars Sonja Kolačarić, Katarina Radivojević, Nenad Jezdić, Stefan Kapičić, and Olivera Katarina.

It was released in Serbia following a January 30, 2008 premiere at Belgrade's Sava Centar. Made on a budget that exceeds €4 million, the movie was shot during summer 2005 as the most expensive Serbian movie ever (until St. George Shoots the Dragon surpassed it a year later). It then went into a long post-production due to specific CGI requirements.

The musical score was done by Japanese composer Shigeru Umebayashi. Luc Besson's production and distribution companies Blue Pen and EuropaCorp hold the film's foreign market distribution rights.

In September 2008, the film was shown at the 2008 Toronto International Film Festival, where it had three screenings as part of the festival's Vanguard programme. It was shown at the Santa Barbara 2009 International Film Festival (22 January – 1 February). In August 2009, it premiered in France.

Plot
The movie's plot is set during the 1920s in post-World War I Serbia. Rebuilding after a gruelling armed conflict in which it lost a sizable part of its young male population, the nation is struggling to recover demographically. The situation is especially visible in certain rural parts where this shortage of men threatens to extinguish life completely.

Two sisters, Ognjenka and Mala Boginja from a fictional village that has no males of marrying age, set off for the city in search of good men to bring home.

Reception and reaction

Serbia
Despite a lot of hype, Charleston & Vendettas reviews in the Serbian media were a mixed bag.

Web magazine Popboks called it a cross between an A movie and a B movie. According to their reviewer Vladislava Vojnović, despite being clearly conceived as an A movie "with production whose plenitude is on full display—from glamorous make-up, costume design, and cinematography over to impeccable picture & sound quality and last but not least Sonja Kolačarić's fascinating portrayal—Charleston & Vendetta also contains many B movie liabilities like a subpar screenplay with plenty of holes".

In similar vein, Politikas film critic Dubravka Lakić praises the movie's look, but has problems with its screenplay oversights, all the while feeling this "postmodern cheerful fairy tale for adults" is "more of a glamorously packaged oversized trailer than a story-based product with coherent beginning, middle and end".

The review penned by B92's Gavrilo Petrović was more of the same, extolling the film's "magical look that brings certain French blockbusters to mind" with "brilliant photography, grandiose sequences and costumes, opulent cinematography, mostly impeccable editing, and computer generated imagery that stands up to anything seen in other great-looking movies" while criticizing "the way dramaturgy takes a back seat to aggressive spectacle sometime into the film with two initially likeable heroines suddenly turning into detached fashion models while all that is required from the multitude of supporting actresses is to look good in slow-motion".

NIN magazine's Saša Janković was very critical, calling the film "an example of Serbian megalomania" and adding that "its screenplay is incomplete while the direction is at times fairly arbitrary".

On the other hand, the film got its most glowing review from Blics Milan Vlajčić, who called it "an extraordinary moment for new Serbian film". In between praises for the whole cast, Vlajčić especially notices director and writer Uroš Stojanović, "whose debut showed maturity in stylistic composition of a comedy that contains patterns of quite a few genres—from melodrama to fantasy".

Croatia
Before general release, the movie premiered at the 2008 Motovun Film Festival on July 28, 2008.

2008 Toronto International Film Festival
After the screenings held on September 8, 10, and 13, the film, which was shown under the title Tears for Sale, attracted some attention in the English-language media gathered at the festival.

Now magazine gave it a very poor one-star mark, with its reviewer referring to it as "a demented Serbian fantasy". He continued with describing it as "a Serbian version of Amélie, if you think Amélie is a movie about hot ladies with prominent facial features interacting with a series of expensive digital effects" before exclaiming: "I'm tempted to hail this as one of the fest's must-see movies—you really must see it to understand the depths of its batshit craziness".

Todd Brown of showcase.ca and twitchfilm.net, on the other hand, loved it, calling it "a remarkable film on a number of levels that manages what seems like an impossible task: balancing the tragic history of its home nation with a sense of legitimate magic and wonder". He has further praise for director Stojanovic and the "stunning visuals". Finally, he glows about the movie feeling like "a Grimms' fairy tale come to life, a world where magic exists but is also accompanied by darkness, death, sex and more".

Movie City Newss David Poland penned a generally affirmative review, summing up the movie as "a fairy tale filled with dark jokes, estrogen, sex, and explosions". He further notices the film's style "that reaches beyond Gilliam with a profoundly Eastern European sensibility and a fascinating approach to the idea of the feminine" as well as predicts that with this film Stojanovic has become one of the "next hot candidates for a Hollywood slot".

United States
Very soon after the satisfactory buzz and attention Tears for Sale got at the Toronto International Film Festival, news appeared that the movie would get a theater release in the United States.

The film's promotion in the United States began months earlier in March 2008, without it even being available for viewing in American cinemas or festivals. Its main selling point at that stage was the political upheaval in Serbia at the time with parliamentary elections being held following a government's fall after the independence of Kosovo, all of which led to the Los Angeles Times publishing a large piece about the movie written by its staff writer Tracy Wilkinson.

In June 2008, another American publication took notice. The review in Variety by Alissa Simon also touches on politics as she sees the movie as "a postmodern allegorical tale" which "succeeds in poking fun at various Serbian national myths and symbols with its strong, lusty, independent women, eager-to-fight men and sacrilegious shenanigans in a hearse and among tombstones". Among praises for the visuals and special effects, she admits that the movie "will require careful handling and critical support to reach international audiences".

American audiences had a chance to see the movie on January 27, 2009 at the Santa Barbara International Film Festival. The film also won a general admiration at the Syracuse International Film Festival (Syracuse, New York) on April 28, 2009.

France 
On August 12, 2009, the movie had its theatrical release in France. It was shown with the name Charleston et Vendette, under the slogan "La chasse a l’homme est ouverte!" (The hunt for men has begun!).

The reviews in the French press were somewhat reserved. Le Monde praised "the spellbinding atmosphere with flights of poetry, boisterous jubilation, and Yugoslav frenzy that brings the fever of Emir Kusturica to mind", but has issues with the "chaotic screenplay arcs drawn from Serbian folklore, culture, and history with codes that escape us".

Box office
As of September 2008, Serbia is the only country where Tears for Sale has gone into general theater release.

Despite the lukewarm reviews, Serbian audiences have responded to the movie in large numbers. Shown on twenty screens during its first weekend in general release (February 1–3, 2008), Charleston & Vendetta took in a gross amount of US$80,699. Its second weekend (February 8–10, also on twenty screens) in Serbian theaters was even more successful, with US$92,377 earned. During the calendar year 2008, Tears for Sale was the most watched movie in Serbian cinemas with a total gross of US$634,620.

In France, the move had very modest box-office take of US$19,314 during its short theatrical run.

DVD release
The film is set for DVD distribution in Australia and the United Kingdom through Icon Entertainment International, a subsidiary of Icon Productions.

See also 
List of most expensive non-English-language films

References

External links

Časkom za Ognjenku, Press, December 24, 2007
Olivera Katarina: "Ukleta" žena igra čarlston, MTS Mondo, January 11, 2008
Čarlston za Ognjenku za sada najgledaniji, MTS Mondo, February 6, 2008
Čarlston za Ognjenku videlo 115.000 ljudi, MTS Mondo, February 25, 2008
Svetska publika nestrpljivo čeka "Čarlston", MTS Mondo, March 27, 2008
Carlsto za Ognjenku at 2008 Toronto International Film Festival

2008 films
2000s fantasy comedy films
Serbian fantasy comedy films
2000s Serbian-language films
Films scored by Shigeru Umebayashi
2008 comedy films
Films set in Serbia
History of Serbia on film
Cultural depictions of Serbian people
Films shot in Serbia
Films set in the 1920s